was a designer of ukiyo-e Japanese woodblock prints and an illustrator of books and newspapers who was active from about 1850 to about 1880. He was born in Edo (modern Tokyo), but neither his date of birth nor date of death is known. However, he was the oldest pupil of Utagawa Kuniyoshi who excelled in prints of warriors, kabuki actors, beautiful women, and foreigners (Yokohama-e).  He may not have seen any of the foreign scenes he depicted.

Yoshitora was prolific: he produced over 60 print series and illustrated over 100 books.  In 1849 he produced an irreverent print called Dōke musha: Miyo no wakamochi ("Funny Warriors—Our Ruler's New Year's Rice Cakes"), which depicts Oda Nobunaga, Akechi Mitsuhide, and Toyotomi Hideyoshi making mochi rice cakes for the shōgun Tokugawa Ieyasu.  A poem by Sawaya Kōkichi accompanies it, reading "Kimi ga yo wo tsuki katametari haru no mochi" ("Tamping down the reign firm and solid like spring rice cakes").  Censors interpreted the print as a criticism of authority and had Yoshitora manacles for fifty days.  Soon after Yoshitora was expelled from Kuniyoshi's studio, possibly due to the print, but he continued to produce illustrations prolifically.

From the 1860s Yoshitora produced Yokohama-e pictures of foreigners amid rapid modernization that came to Japan after the country was opened to trade.  He collaborated on a number of landscape series, and in the Meiji period that began in 1868 he also worked in newspapers.  The last of his known works appeared in 1882.

Notes

References

 Lane, Richard. (1978).  Images from the Floating World, The Japanese Print. Oxford: Oxford University Press. ; OCLC 5246796
 
 
 Roberts, Laurance P. (1976). A Dictionary of Japanese Artists:  Painting, Sculpture, Ceramics, Prints, Lacquer.  New York: Weatherhill. : OCLC 185975982

External links

19th-century Japanese people
Ukiyo-e artists
Yoshitora